Zandile Senzekile Masuku (born 2 December 1998) is a South African rugby sevens player. She was born and raised in Limpopo province, South Africa. She competed for South Africa at the 2022 Commonwealth Games in Birmingham. She scored a brace of tries in their seventh-place victory over Sri Lanka.

References 

Living people
1998 births
Female rugby sevens players
South Africa international women's rugby sevens players
Rugby sevens players at the 2022 Commonwealth Games